Ceylonitermes is a genus of termites in the subfamily Nasutitermitinae. They are found in South and Southeast Asia.

Species
There are two species:
 Ceylonitermes escherichi (Holmgren, 1911) – Sri Lanka
 Ceylonitermes indicola Thakur, 1976 – India (Kerala), Indonesia (Sumatra)

References

Termites
Termite genera
Insects of Asia